JSC Sarajishvili is one of the oldest manufacturers of brandy in Georgia. It was founded in 1884 by a Georgian aristocrat David Sarajishvili. After nationalization of the company by the communists, the name was changed to Tbilisi Cognac Factory. In 1994, the company was privatized.

The company mainly specializes in production of high-quality brandy, cognac and vodka, exporting the produce to countries all over the world.

References

Wineries of Georgia (country)
Brands of Georgia (country)
Companies of Georgia (country)
Wineries of the Soviet Union
Companies nationalised by the Soviet Union
Drink companies of the Soviet Union